Isaszeg is a town in Pest county, Budapest metropolitan area, Hungary. It has a population of 10,979 (2007).

Sightseeing
On the top of the cemetery hill stands the old parochial church of the village. It was last rebuilt in gothic style. However, the foundations of the old rotunda is visible north and south of the nave of the church. The recent church was built by the eastern extension (apsis) and by western extension (nave and choir) of the original rotunda. The church has western tower with rectangular lower part and octagonal upper part, as in many Hungarian old churches (for example: Nagymaros, Csurgó, Aracs, Somogyvámos, Szeged - Dömötör tower, Felsőörs)

Twin towns – sister cities

Isaszeg is twinned with:
 Bojanów, Poland
 Cozmeni, Romania
 Kechnec, Slovakia
 Sânmartin, Romania
 Suza (Kneževi Vinogradi), Croatia
 Trstená, Slovakia

Isaszeg also cooperates with Mali Iđoš, Serbia.

Notable people
György Lázár (1924–2014), Communist politician

References

 Genthon I. (1959): Magyarország műemlékei. (Architectural Heritage of Hungary). Budapest
 Gerevich Tibor: Magyarország románkori emlékei. (Die romanische Denkmäler Ungarns.) Egyetemi nyomda. Budapest, 1938. 
 Gerő, L. (1984): Magyar műemléki ABC. (Hungarian Architectural Heritage ABC.) Budapest
 Gervers-Molnár, V. (1972): A középkori Magyarország rotundái. (Rotunda in the Medieval Hungary). Akadémiai, Budapest
 Szőnyi O. (É.n.): Régi magyar templomok. Alte Ungarische Kirchen. Anciennes églises Hongroises. Hungarian Churches of Yore. A Műemlékek Országos Bizottsága. Mirályi Magyar Egyetemi Nyomda, Budapest.
 Henszlmann, I. (1876): Magyarország ó-keresztyén, román és átmeneti stylü mű-emlékeinek rövid ismertetése, (Old-Christian, Romanesque and Transitional Style Architecture in Hungary). Királyi Magyar Egyetemi Nyomda, Budapest

External links

  in Hungarian
 Isaszeg Map
 Aerial photography of Isaszeg

Populated places in Pest County
Romanesque architecture in Hungary